Crisis Works is the debut LP from Young Legionnaire. The album was released on 9 May 2011 on Wichita Records. The album was produced by Rich Jackson who has worked with Future of the Left and The Automatic.

Reception

Critical response

Crisis Works received generally positive reviews, scoring a 69 out of 100 ("generally favorable reviews") on Metacritic based on six reviews.

Track listing

References

2011 debut albums
Young Legionnaire albums
Wichita Recordings albums